Hamby is a Danish and English surname.

Meaning of Hamby (English): habitational name from Hanby near Welton le Marsh, in Lincolnshire, which is named from the Old Norse personal name Hundi + Old Norse býr ‘farmstead’, ‘settlement’. Perhaps an altered spelling of French Hambye, a habitational name from a place in Manche.

Notable people with the surname include:

Anthony Freskyn Charles Hamby Chaplin, 3rd Viscount Chaplin (1906–1981), amateur zoologist and musician
Barbara Hamby (born 1952), American poet, fiction writer, editor and critic
Jeannette Hamby (1933–2012), American politician and nurse
Jessica Hamby, fictional character in the True Blood series
Jim Hamby (1897–1991), American baseball player
Priscilla Hamby (born 1982), American illustrator and comic book artist
Roger Hamby (born 1943), former NASCAR Cup Series driver
Andrew Hamby (born 2003), the CS 1332 supreme unit test writer

See also
Hamby Park, municipal park in northwest Hillsboro, Oregon, United States
Hamby Shore (1886–1918), Canadian ice hockey player
Hambye

References